Office Politics is the twelfth studio album by Irish chamber pop band the Divine Comedy, released on 7 June 2019 by Divine Comedy Records. It is a concept album concerning the workplace and the ever-growing role machines play in it. The deluxe edition of the album features a bonus disc of Divine Comedy singer-songwriter Neil Hannon's original piano demos for his songs for Royal National Theatre's 2007 musical adaption of Swallows and Amazons.

Hannon has said that the use of marimba was inspired by bands such as Blondie, on their single "The Tide Is High", and Siouxsie Sioux's second band the Creatures. Hannon also cited the tribal drums of early Adam Ant music as another inspiration.

Metacritic, which assigns a normalised rating out of 100 to reviews from mainstream critics, awarded the album an average score of 77, based on seven reviews, indicating "generally good reviews."

Track listing

Personnel 
Credits adapted from Office Politics liner notes.

Musicians
Neil Hannon – vocals, synthesizers (tracks 1–5, 7–10, 13), guitars (tracks 1, 2, 9, 11 and 16), bass guitar (track 1), piano (tracks 1 and 2), electric piano (tracks 5, 9 and 10), percussion (track 1), sampler (tracks 1 and 6), handclaps (tracks 1, 9 and 13), drum machine (track 2), drums (tracks 2 and 7), Mellotron (tracks 2, 4, 5, 7, 9, 11, 12, 14 and 15), mandolin (tracks 4 and 11), glockenspiel (track 4), electric organ (tracks 5, 6, 10 and 13), harmonica (track 6), banjo (track 14)
Simon Little – bass guitar (tracks 3–7, 9, 11, 12, 14–16) , backing vocals (tracks 1, 9, 12–14), handclaps (tracks 1 and 13), sound effects (track 5), synthesizer (track 8)
Andrew Skeet – piano (tracks 3, 4, 11–16), backing vocals (tracks 1, 9, 12–14), handclaps (tracks 1, 9 and 13), drums (track 1), electric piano (track 3), whistling (track 6), synthesizer (track 8), sampler (track 13)
Tim Weller – drums (tracks 1, 3–6, 9, 12, 14–16), handclaps (tracks 1 and 13), percussion (track 5), drum machine (track 8)
Ian Watson – backing vocals (tracks 1, 9, 12–14), handclaps (tracks 1, 9 and 13), synthesizers (tracks 3 and 8), organ (track 11), electric organ (tracks 12 and 14), accordion (tracks 12, 14 and 15), Mellotron (track 16)
Tosh Flood – guitars (tracks 2–6, 9, 11, 12, 14 and 15), backing vocals (tracks 1, 3, 9, 12–14), handclaps (tracks 1, 9 and 13), drums (track 1), Mellotron (track 8), synthesizer (track 8), Omnichord (track 12)

Additional musicians
Ber Quinn – backing vocals (track 1), synthesizer (track 8)
Jake Jackson – backing vocals (tracks 9 and 14)
Katie Kissoon – backing vocals (tracks 2, 3, 9, 12 and 15)
Sonia Jones – backing vocals (tracks 2, 3, 9, 12 and 15)
Hazel Fernandez – backing vocals (tracks 2, 3, 9, 12 and 15)
Pete Ruotolo – backing vocals (track 1), guest vocals (track 13)
Chris Difford – guest vocals (track 4)
Cathy Davey – guest vocals (track 4)
Thomas Walsh – guest vocals (track 4), backing vocals (track 5)

Orchestra
Warren Zielinski, Richard George, Alison Dods, Patrick Kiernan, Tom Pigott-Smith, Natalia Bonner, Lucy Wilkins, Perry Montague-Mason, Gillon Cameron – violin (tracks 1, 11, 13 and 16)
Bruce White, Emma Owens, Reiad Chibah – viola (tracks 1, 11, 13 and 16)
Chris Worsey, Caroline Dale, Ian Burdge – cello (tracks 1, 11, 13 and 16)
Richard Pryce – double bass (tracks 1, 11, 13 and 16)
David Pyatt, John Ryan – French horn (tracks 4, 11, 15 and 16)
Mark Templeton, Richard Edwards – trombones (tracks 11, 15 and 16)
Dan Newell – trumpet (tracks 11, 15 and 16)
Owen Slade – tuba (tracks 11, 15 and 16)
Richard Skinner – bassoon (track 11)
Eliza Marshall – flute (track 11)
Max Spiers – oboe (track 11)
Martin Robertson – clarinet (track 11)

Production
Neil Hannon – production, engineering (tracks 2, 5, 7, 9, 10 and 13)
Ber Quinn – engineering (tracks 1, 4–8, 11–14, 16), mixing (track 7)
Guy Massey – engineering (tracks 1–3, 8, 9, 14 and 15), mixing (tracks 1–6, 8–16)
Jake Jackson – engineering (tracks 1, 11, 13, 15 and 16)
John Prestage – assistant engineering
Kevin Callanan – assistant engineering
Tom Leach – assistant engineering
Frank Arkwright – mastering

Design
Ben Meadows – photography
Raphael Neal – photography
Matthew Cooper – artwork design

Charts

References 

2019 albums
The Divine Comedy (band) albums